Seasons of the Heart may refer to:
Seasons of the Heart (1993 film), a evangelistic film starring Leigh Lombardi and Sam Hennings
Seasons of the Heart (1994 film), a television movie starring George Segal and Carol Burnett
Seasons of the Heart (album), a 1982 John Denver album, or the title song